June Rodgers (born 1959) is an Irish comedian, singer and actor. Much of her repertoire consists of multiple character skits, mainly focusing on working-class Dublin themes, including the characters of 'Jacinta O'Brien' and 'Oliver Bond'. Her 2014 Merry Month of June Tour alone required 20 costume changes. Rodgers' shows frequently include elements of song, dance and cabaret.

Early life
Rodgers was born in the suburb of Tallaght when it was "still a sleepy rural village in County Dublin". In a 2014 interview, she recounted her earliest memory of sitting on the garden wall watching tractors and cattle passing by.

There was no tradition of theatre in her family, although Rodgers recalls that the family would "go on Sunday drives and my mother and father would be singing in the front, and we (herself and her sister Linda) would be falling asleep in the back". She attended Rathgar National School, and St Patrick's Catholic Grammar School, where Bono was a classmate for a few years before he went to Mount Temple. She notes that she was "laughed at" in school due to her weight. Rodgers won the Miss Tallaght pageant in 1978.

She and her parents moved to Brittas when the suburb of Tallaght began to be heavily developed. Shortly after the move, her mother died aged 56, and Rodgers and her father moved back to Firhouse, in the vicinity of Tallaght. Within a short space of time her father also passed away, aged 63.

Career
During the 1980s, Rodgers worked for nine and a half years in a Fujitsu factory in Tallaght, where she spent "eight hours a day looking down a micro-scope at cells on microchips". Fujitsu started a society where employees could perform together at the John Player Tops Of The Town talent contest, and Rodgers joined as a dancer in the back row. Eventually, she succeeded in making a higher billing, and began doing comedy as a hobby.

Rodgers claims her big break came when performing at a talent competition at the Clontarf Castle Hotel, at which she was spotted by television host Gay Byrne who presented the Irish chat show The Late Late Show. The following week, she received a phone call at her factory from The Late Late inviting her to perform three minutes on it that coming Friday. As part of the performance, she presented the characters 'Bridget the Beangharda' and a Henry Street dealer. She credits this first break on The Late Late Show as "pure luck". Rodgers appeared numerous times on the programme over the following years, so much so that when comedian Tommy Tiernan made one of his first appearances on the Late Late, he quipped "I'm delighted to be on the show, June Rodgers must be working".

Rodgers spent several years on the pantomime circuit in Ireland in the early 1990s. During this time, she, along with Eileen Reed, played the Ugly Sisters in Cinderella. The comedy writers Martin Higgins and Tom Roche helped Rodgers develop the characters which she became known for.

She credits Irish comedian Brendan Grace as an influence on her style, and used to watch him perform at cabaret shows in a pub in Terenure during the 1970s and 80s. She also credits Lucille Ball as an influence, stating "She was one of the first ballsy comedians on our screens at a time when women were portrayed as demure and ladylike". Rodgers notes that she got her sense of humour from her father.

Health
In 2019, Rodgers revealed that she was left unable to work for 18 months after an incident in which a fall had cut off the blood supply down the right hand side of her body resulting in the collapse of her hip bone over time. After a successful diagnosis by a Dublin orthopaedic surgeon, she received a hip replacement. By October 2019, Rodgers reported that she was "100 per cent pain free", and ready to return to the stage.

Personal life
In the mid-1990s, Rodgers met her future husband Peter Lane at a show in Clontarf Castle. She was performing as a character who sold cheap bananas, and every night would throw a banana out to the audience. On the evening in question, Peter caught the banana. They married in September 1997.

The Irish former rugby union and rugby league player Ian Dowling is married to Rodger's niece.

She lives in Firhouse, County Dublin.

Filmography
Agnes Browne (1999)
On the Nose (2001)
Mrs. Brown's Boys D'Movie (2014)
The Clinic (TV series) (Season 7) (2009)

References

External links
 

1959 births
Irish sketch comedians
Living people
Irish women comedians
Comedians from Dublin (city)
20th-century Irish comedians
21st-century Irish comedians
Irish stand-up comedians